"Tell Me" is a song by American/Danish glam metal band White Lion. The song was released in 1988 and is the second single from their 1987 album Pride. It peaked at number 25 on the Mainstream Rock chart and number 58 on the Billboard Hot 100.

Background and release
"Tell Me" features a music video and together along with "Wait" and "When the Children Cry" made Pride a massive success.
 
Mike Tramp has said,

"It just proves that the album is timeless. Those songs will live on forever." 

"Tell Me" is a snapshot of the late 1980s sound. The production had that "stadium" sound with a lot of echo which featured in the video.

Compilations
The song along with the rest of Pride was featured on White Lion's 2020 compilation album, "'All You Need Is Rock 'N' Roll - The Complete Albums 1985-1991'".

Track listing
"Tell Me" – 4:28 
"All Join Our Hands" – 4:11

Personnel
Mike Tramp – lead vocals
Vito Bratta – lead guitar
James Lomenzo – bass guitar
Greg D'Angelo – drums

Charts

References

White Lion songs
1987 songs
1988 singles
Songs written by Vito Bratta
Songs written by Mike Tramp
Atlantic Records singles